Lutfiya al-Qaba'ili (born 1948) is a Libyan journalist and short story writer.

Al-Qaba-ili is possessed of a degree in geography from al-Fatih University, and for several years edited al-Bayt magazine; she has continued to work in the media since. Her career as a writer of short fiction began in the mid-1960s, when she found herself writing numerous pieces which she later collected for publication. Her book Amani mu'allaba (Canned Hopes) was published in Tripoli in 1977.

References

1948 births
Living people
Libyan women writers
Libyan short story writers
Libyan journalists
Libyan women journalists
Women short story writers
Women magazine editors
20th-century short story writers
20th-century journalists
20th-century women writers
20th-century Libyan writers
21st-century Libyan women writers
21st-century Libyan writers
20th-century Libyan women writers